Ray Ross (born 2 May 1900, date of death unknown) was an Australian rules footballer who played with Essendon in the Victorian Football League (VFL).

Football

Essendon (VFL)
Identified as "an Essendon junior", Ross played his first game for Essendon against Fitzroy, at the Brunswick Street Oval, on 25 June 1921. Playing on the half-forward flank, he kicked two goals, and it was noted that he "made a very good first appearance".

In his last senior game for Essendon, against Fitzroy, at the East Melbourne Cricket Ground, on 10 September 1921, he scored a goal. The match, which finished with a draw – Essendom 10.14 (74) to Fitzroy 11.8 (74) – was Essendon's last game at the East Melbourne Cricket Ground. Despite being considered one of Essendon's best players, Ross was not selected for the last match of the 1921 season, and he did not play VFL senior football ever again.

Family
The son of Mary Alice Ross, Raymond Paul Ross was born at Hotham West on 2 May 1900.

Notes

References

 Maplestone, M., Flying Higher: History of the Essendon Football Club 1872–1996, Essendon Football Club, (Melbourne), 1996.

External links 

1900 births
Year of death missing
Australian rules footballers from Victoria (Australia)
Essendon Football Club players